Miss Arizona USA is the beauty pageant that selects the representative for the state of Arizona in the Miss USA pageant, and the name of the title held by its winner. The pageant is directed by Casting Crown Productions.

Arizona's most successful placements were in 1965 and 1980, when Jane Nelson and Jineane Ford, respectively, placed as the first runner-up. Ford later became Miss USA 1980 after the original winner Shawn Weatherly was crowned Miss Universe 1980. Arizona's most recent placement was in 2016, when Chelsea Myers placed in the Top 15.

The longest reigning titleholder was Yesenia Vidales in 2020 at 1 year, 6 months and 5 days, while Cassidy Jo Jacks was the shortest reigning titleholder in 2021 ended her reign at 10 months and 19 days.

The current Miss Arizona USA is Isabel Ticlo of Phoenix and was crowned in Gilbert on May 30, 2022. Ticlo represented Arizona at Miss USA 2022.

Gallery of titleholders

Results summary

Placements in Miss USA
1st Runners-Up: Jane Nelson (1965), Jineane Ford (1980)
2nd Runners-Up: Susanne Pottenger (1971), Diane Martin (1987), Alicia-Monique Blanco (2009)
3rd Runners-Up: Ruth Hayes (1969), Sherry Nix (1973)
Top 10/11/12: Carlys Peterson (1974), Toni Abranovic (1977), Ana Rupert (1979), Cassie Hill (1981), Michelle Ducote (1985), Lee Anne Locken (1989), Maricarroll Verlinde (1991), Dannis Shephard (1992), Stacey Kole (1998)
Top 15/16/20: Jerri Michaelson (1962), Diane McGarry (1963), Roxanne Neeley (1966), Judianne Magnusson (1967), Danielle Demski (2004), Brenna Sakas (2006), Brittany Brannon (2011), Jordan Wessel (2014), Maureen Montagne (2015), Chelsea Myers (2016)

Arizona holds a record of 26 placements at Miss USA.

Awards
Miss Congeniality: Cara Jackson (1999)
Miss Photogenic: Jineane Ford (1980), Brittany Brannon (2011)
Best State Costume: Daria Sparling (1984), Michelle Ducote (1985), Maricarroll Verlinde (1991)

Winners

Color key

Notes

References

External links

Official website
 

Arizona
Arizona culture
Women in Arizona
1952 establishments in Arizona
Recurring events established in 1952
Annual events in Arizona
Events in Phoenix, Arizona